The 2016 AFF Championship Final was the final of the 2016 AFF Championship, the 11th edition of the top-level Association of Southeast Asian Nations (ASEAN) football tournament organised by the ASEAN Football Federation (AFF).

The final was contested in two-legged home-and-away format between Indonesia and Thailand. The first leg was hosted by Indonesia at the Pakansari Stadium in Bogor on 14 December 2016, while the second leg was hosted by Thailand at the Rajamangala Stadium in Bangkok on 17 December 2016.

Background 
Based on previous records, Indonesia had reached the AFF Championship final four times (2000, 2002, 2004 and 2010), finishing runners-up in all attempts. Thailand had reached the AFF Championship final seven times (1996, 2000, 2002, 2007, 2008, 2012 and 2014) and had won the tournament four times (1996, 2000, 2002 and 2014). The two sides last met on 7 December 2010 in the group stage of the 2010 AFF Championship. Indonesia, who began the 2016 AFF Championship as an underdog, was ranked 179 in the FIFA World Rankings and tenth among AFF teams while Thailand, who entered the tournament as a clear favorite, was ranked 146 overall and fourth among AFF teams. Thailand entered the 2016 AFF Championship as four-time ASEAN champions. Thailand was first crowned champions of ASEAN in the 1996 that was held in Singapore with a final score of 1–0 against Malaysia. In the 2000, Thailand taking home the title through a 4–1 victory against Indonesia. In the 2002, Thailand won against Indonesia through a penalty shoot-out. In the 2007 and 2008, Thailand reached the final to meet Singapore and Vietnam but however loses in the final games. In the 2012, Thailand again failed after losing by 2–3 on aggregate against Singapore. But in the 2014, Thailand managed to return by winning 4–3 on aggregate against Malaysia. The 2016 final was Indonesia's fifth consecutive time contesting an AFF Championship final, after losing four times against Thailand, Singapore and Malaysia.

Up until the beginning of the tournament, Indonesia had just set everything in control after a series of internal upheavals within the PSSI, which cost the country's qualification attempts for the 2018 FIFA World Cup and 2019 AFC Asian Cup. Having just ended the crisis, Indonesia's perpetration was in total disarray and thus they had to take back their old boss, Alfred Riedl, to manage the team and fix the messes. In comparison, Thailand's perpetration was largely smooth and problem-free. Therefore, not many people even imagined Indonesia could progress for the semi-finals, leave alone winning the tournament.

Route to the final 

Both Indonesia and Thailand were drawn into Group A of the 2016 AFF Championship, along with powerhouse sides Philippines and Singapore. After winning all three group matches, Thailand finished first in the group. Indonesia finished second in the group to progress to the knockout phase of the tournament. Thailand's first match victory was against Indonesia with a score of 4–2. From there, they continue the path by beating both Singapore and the Philippines by 1–0. Thailand progressed to the semi-finals to face Group B runner-up and subsequent host of Myanmar. In the first-leg in Yangon, Thailand won 2–0 before winning the second-leg in Bangkok by 4–0 with a total aggregate of 6–0. Indonesia's lose their first match against Thailand before drawing 2–2 against the host Philippines. In the third match against Singapore, they won 2–1 before progressing to the semi-finals to face Group B winner of Vietnam. In the first-leg in Bogor, Indonesia won 2–1 before drawing 2–2 in the extra time in the second-leg in Hanoi with a total aggregate of 4–3.

Note: In all results below, the score of the finalist is given first (H: home; A: away).

Matches

First leg

Second leg 

Thailand won 3–2 on aggregate.

References

External links 
 AFF Suzuki Cup 2016 – Official website

Final
2016
Thailand national football team matches
Indonesia national football team matches
December 2016 sports events in Asia
2016 in Thai football
2016 in Indonesian football